Vítor Silva Assis de Oliveira Jr. known as  Vítor Júnior or just Júnior (born September 15, 1986 in Porto Alegre), is a Brazilian attacking midfielder who plays for São José.

He also known as Júnior Juninho or just Juninho in Europe.

He was signed by Kawasaki Frontale in 2008, he then signed a new deal in January 2009.

In July 2018, Júnior joined Siam Navy on a one-year deal.

Club statistics

Honours
Dinamo Zagreb
Croatian League: 2006

Sport
Pernambuco State League: 2007

Internacional
Campeonato Gaúcho: 2013

References

External links

 CBF
 santos.globo.com

1986 births
Living people
Brazilian footballers
Brazilian expatriate footballers
Sportspeople from Rio Grande do Sul
Sport Club Internacional players
Cruzeiro Esporte Clube players
GNK Dinamo Zagreb players
FC Koper players
Sport Club do Recife players
Santos FC players
Kawasaki Frontale players
Atlético Clube Goianiense players
Sport Club Corinthians Paulista players
Botafogo de Futebol e Regatas players
Coritiba Foot Ball Club players
Figueirense FC players
Royal Thai Navy F.C. players
Al-Qadsiah FC players
FC Aktobe players
ABC Futebol Clube players
Brusque Futebol Clube players
Villa Nova Atlético Clube players
Esporte Clube São José players
Campeonato Brasileiro Série A players
Campeonato Brasileiro Série B players
Campeonato Brasileiro Série C players
Slovenian PrvaLiga players
Croatian Football League players
J1 League players
Thai League 1 players
Kazakhstan Premier League players
Saudi Professional League players
Association football midfielders
Brazilian expatriate sportspeople in Slovenia
Brazilian expatriate sportspeople in Croatia
Brazilian expatriate sportspeople in Thailand
Brazilian expatriate sportspeople in Kazakhstan
Brazilian expatriate sportspeople in Japan
Brazilian expatriate sportspeople in Mexico
Brazilian expatriate sportspeople in Saudi Arabia
Expatriate footballers in Slovenia
Expatriate footballers in Croatia
Expatriate footballers in Thailand
Expatriate footballers in Kazakhstan
Expatriate footballers in Japan
Expatriate footballers in Mexico
Expatriate footballers in Saudi Arabia